Javier Lozano may refer to:

Javier Lozano Barragán, Mexican Roman Catholic cardinal
Javier Lozano Alarcón, Mexican politician
Javier Lozano Chavira (born 1971), Mexican footballer